Shoqarij-e Olya (also Romanized as Shoqārīj-e ‘Olyā; also known as Shoghārīj-e ‘Olyā, Sheghārīj-e ‘Olyā, Saghārīj-e Bālā, Shagharich ‘Olya, Shaghārīj-e Bālā, and Shoghārīj-e Bālā) is a village in Miyan Ab Rural District, in the Central District of Shushtar County, Khuzestan Province, Iran. At the 2006 census, its population was 84, in 16 families.

References 

Populated places in Shushtar County